Adarsh maurya live in godhi
Godhi is a village near Korba in Chhattisgarh, India.

References

Villages in Korba district